The Civil Order of Saxony, also known as the Saxon Order of Merit, was established on 7 June 1815 by King Frederick Augustus I of Saxony. It was a general order of merit for the royal subjects of the Kingdom of Saxony for distinguished civic service and virtue.

Classes of the order

Upon its founding in 1815, the order was divided into seven classes of merit:

Knight Grand Cross
Commander First Class
Commander Second Class
Knight
Small Cross
Gold Civil Medal
Silver Civil Medal

With an amendment of 18 March 1858, the Small Cross became the Cross of Honour, eventually becoming Knight Second Class on 31 January 1876.  The decree also replaced the gold and silver medals with civilian crosses of distinction, in gold and silver. The classes of the order thus became:

Knight Grand Cross
Commander First Class
Commander Second Class
Knight First Class
Knight Second Class
Golden Civil Cross
Silver Civil Cross

References
This article is a translation in part from the same article on the Italian Wikipedia

Orders, decorations, and medals of Saxony
Awards established in 1815